The Deputy Minister of Domestic Trade and Living Costs is a non-Malaysian cabinet position serving as deputy head of the Ministry of Domestic Trade and Living Costs.

The Ministry of Domestic Trade and Consumerism was created in 1990 as a reconstruction of the Ministry of Trade and Industry. International trade functions were eventually transferred to the Ministry of International Trade and Industry, leaving the International Trade Ministry in charge of Industry proper. In 2022, Ministry of Domestic Trade and Consumerism was renamed to Ministry of Domestic Trade and Living Costs.

List of Deputy Ministers 
The following individuals have been appointed as Deputy Minister of Domestic Trade, or any of its precedent titles:

Colour key (for political coalition/parties):

See also 
 Minister of Domestic Trade and Living Costs (Malaysia)
 Minister of International Trade and Industry (Malaysia)
 Deputy Minister of International Trade and Industry (Malaysia)

References 

Ministry of Domestic Trade and Consumer Affairs (Malaysia)